The British Swimming Championships - 100 metres freestyle winners formerly the (Amateur Swimming Association (ASA) National Championships) are listed below.

The event was originally contested over 110 yards and then switched to the metric conversion of 100 metres in 1971. In 1963 Bob McGregor of Scotland set a world record in the heats (54.4 sec) and the final (54.1 sec). In 1975 and 1984 there was a dead-heat in the women's final.

100 metres freestyle champions

See also
British Swimming
List of British Swimming Championships champions

References

Swimming in the United Kingdom